Bernadette (born September 14, 2016) is a female captive-bred Siberian tiger that lives at the Oregon Zoo, in Portland, Oregon, United States. 

Bernadette was born as part of a captive breeding program at the Milwaukee County Zoo in Wisconsin on September 14, 2016. She was born to mother Amba in a litter of three, along with sister Eloise and brother Kash. The cubs made their public debut in December of that year. Bernadette was the smallest in the litter. She and Eloise were transferred to the Oregon Zoo in March 2019 as part of the Species Survival Plan for Siberian tigers, which are at extreme risk of extinction in the wild.

References

2016 animal births
Individual tigers
Oregon Zoo